Tkemali (Georgian: ტყემალი) is a Georgian sauce primarily made of cherry plum, sometimes alucha or other varieties of plum. Both red and green varieties of plum are used. The flavor of the sauce varies, but generally tends to be pungently tart. To lower the tartness level, occasionally sweeter types of plums are added during preparation. Traditionally, besides plum the following ingredients are used: garlic, pennyroyal, cumin, coriander, dill, chili pepper and salt.

Tkemali is used for fried or grilled meat, poultry and potato dishes, and has a place in Georgian cuisine similar to the one ketchup has in the United States. It can be made at home, but is also mass-produced by several Georgian and Russian companies.

See also
 List of plum dishes
 List of dips
 List of sauces

References
 The Georgian feast: the vibrant culture and savory food of the Republic of Georgia by Darra Goldstein, University of California Press (1999) - 

Cuisine of Georgia (country)
Plum dishes
Sauces
Sour foods